U-1 class submarine may refer to:
 , a class of two submarines built 1909–1910
 , a class of one submarine built 1906
 , a class of nine submarines built 1941–144